Andorra competed at the 2020 Winter Youth Olympics in Lausanne, Switzerland from 9 to 22 January 2020.

Alpine skiing

Boys

Girls

Ski mountaineering

Boys

Sprint

Mixed

See also
Andorra at the 2020 Summer Olympics

References

2020 in Andorran sport
Nations at the 2020 Winter Youth Olympics
Andorra at the Youth Olympics